Armando Pulido Izaguirre (born March 25, 1989, in Ciudad Victoria, Tamaulipas) is a former professional Mexican footballer who last played for Correcaminos UAT.

References

1989 births
Living people
Mexican footballers
Association football midfielders
Tigres UANL footballers
Club Tijuana footballers
Querétaro F.C. footballers
Correcaminos UAT footballers
Liga MX players
Ascenso MX players
Liga Premier de México players
Tercera División de México players
Footballers from Tamaulipas
People from Ciudad Victoria